The 2018 bwin Grand Slam of Darts was the twelfth staging of the tournament, organised by the Professional Darts Corporation. The event took place from 10–18 November 2018 in Wolverhampton, England, but for the first time in the event's history, it was not at the Wolverhampton Civic Hall, as it is undergoing a two-year renovation. The 2018 tournament was held at Aldersley Leisure Village. Beginning with this tournament, the winner of the title would receive "The Eric Bristow Trophy", named after the legendary player who died in April 2018.

The tournament's defending champion was Michael van Gerwen, who won the tournament in 2017 by defeating Peter Wright 16–12 in the final to win it for a third straight year, but lost in the semi-finals to Gary Anderson by the same scoreline 16–12.

Gerwyn Price won his first PDC major title by defeating Gary Anderson 16–13, in a highly controversial final. Price also became the first Welsh player to win a PDC major title.

The DRA launched an investigation into the behaviour from both players in the final. Price was fined £21,500 for a combination of 'Bringing the sport into disrepute and gamesmanship' in the final and for his Quarter-final clash with Simon Whitlock. Price was also given a three month ban, which was suspended for 6 months. Anderson was given a formal warning for pushing Price on the oche. Price's fine was subsequently reduced on appeal to a total of £11,500.

Dimitri Van den Bergh hit the fourth nine dart leg in Grand Slam of Darts history, in his second round match against Stephen Bunting, and for the first time in the tournament history no Englishman progressed into the quarter-final stage.

Prize money
The prize fund for the Grand Slam was the same as in 2017, with the winner getting £110,000.

Qualifying

PDC Qualifying Tournaments

At most sixteen players could qualify through this method, where the position in the list depicts the priority of the qualification.

As the list of qualifiers from the main tournaments produced fewer than sixteen players, the field of sixteen players is filled from the reserve lists. The first list consists of the winners from 2018 European Tour events, in which the winners are ordered by number of event wins then in Order of Merit position order at the cut-off date.

If there are still less than sixteen qualified players after the winners of European Tour events are added, the winners of 2018 Players Championships events will be added, firstly by winners of multiple events followed by Order of Merit order.

PDC Qualifying Event
A further eight places in the Grand Slam of Darts were filled by qualifiers from a PDC qualifier that took place in Wigan on 5 November.
These are the qualifiers:
 Martin Schindler
 Stephen Bunting
 Andrew Gilding
 Steve Hine
 Mark Webster
 Joe Murnan
 Keegan Brown
 Ryan Searle

BDO Qualifying Tournaments

BDO Ranking qualifiers
The remaining 5 BDO places were determined via the BDO Invitational Rankings at the end of September 2018.

  Jim Williams
  Wesley Harms
  Michael Unterbuchner
  Scott Mitchell
  Gary Robson

Pools

Draw

Group stage

All group matches are best of nine legs  After three games, the top two in each group qualify for the knock-out stage

NB: P = Played; W = Won; L = Lost; LF = Legs for; LA = Legs against; +/− = Plus/minus record, in relation to legs; Pts = Points; Status = Qualified to knockout stage

Group A

10 November

11 November

13 November

Group B

10 November

11 November

13 November

Group C

10 November

11 November

13 November

Group D

10 November

11 November

13 November

Group E

10 November

11 November

12 November

Group F

10 November

11 November

12 November

Group G

10 November

11 November

12 November

Group H

10 November

11 November

12 November

Knockout stage

References

2018
Grand Slam
Grand Slam of Darts
Grand Slam of Darts